Xiaomuhe Township, also Xiaomuhexiang  is a township-level division situated in the Jixi prefecture of Heilongjiang, China, near the Russian border.

See also
List of township-level divisions of Heilongjiang

References

Township-level divisions of Heilongjiang